Western Subanon (also known as Siocon Subanon or simply Subanon) is an Austronesian language belonging Subanen branch of the Greater Central Philippine subgroup. It is spoken by c. 300,000 people in the southwestern part of the Zamboanga Peninsula region of Mindanao.

Distribution and dialects
The Western Subanon speech area includes the villages Malayal, Lintangan, Lanuti, and Limpapa in the municipality of Sibuco, and parts of Siocon, Baliguian, Labason, Surabay, and Ipil, all located in the Zamboanga Peninsula region. The dialects are Siocon and Western Kolibugan (Western Kalibugan).

Phonology
Western Subanon has 15 native consonants.

Consonants

Vowels
Western Subanon has five vowels.

Grammar
Western Subanon has a typical Philippine-type voice system. Unlike most other Philippine languages, it only has three voice categories.

Sample text
The chorus of the Western Subanon song "" 'Let's plant' is shown.

References

Further reading 

 

Greater Central Philippine languages
Languages of Zamboanga del Sur
Languages of Zamboanga del Norte
Languages of Zamboanga Sibugay